Until Thy Wrath Be Past is a 2008 crime novel by Swedish writer Åsa Larsson, fourth in the Rebecka Martinsson series. It was published in the United States in 2011.

Plot 
Someone kills Wilma Persson and Simon Kyrö as they dive on a plane in Vittangijärvi. What kind of old secret have they got on the tracks? And who is prepared to murder anyone to prevent it from coming out? A murder investigation begins where police inspector Anna-Maria Mella is threatened and Chamber Prosecutor Rebecka Martinsson is visited by the dead.

References

2008 Swedish novels
Novels by Åsa Larsson
Rebecka Martinsson books
Swedish crime novels